Melipotis asinus is a species of moth in the family Erebidae. It is found in Argentina.

References

Moths described in 1912
Melipotis
Taxa named by Paul Dognin
Moths of South America